The Orlando Utilities Commission Administration Building is an historic eight-story Modern style building in Orlando, Florida. It began to be used in 1967. It was built by the Orlando Utilities Commission to handle the projected increased volume that would be generated when the University of Central Florida and Walt Disney World started operating. The building was designed by Richard Boone Rodgers.

After the Commission built a new headquarters nearby and moved there, the old Administration Building stood empty for several years. In 2011, it was purchased by a company who turned it into a boutique hotel (currently Aloft Orlando Downtown). The building was added to the National Register of Historic Places on June 7, 2012.

References

Buildings and structures in Orlando, Florida
History of Orlando, Florida
National Register of Historic Places in Orange County, Florida
Government buildings completed in 1967
Government buildings on the National Register of Historic Places in Florida
1967 establishments in Florida